Lasarat (also known as Laso Harrad) is a town in eastern Ethiopia.

Lasarat is served by a station on the Ethio-Djibouti Railways.

Demographics
As of 2005, the population of Lasarat has been estimated to be 2,269. The city inhabitants belong to various mainly Afro-Asiatic-speaking ethnic groups, with the Issa Somali predominant.

References 

Populated places in the Somali Region